Beaulieu Abbey, was a Cistercian abbey in Hampshire, England. It was founded in 1203–1204 by King John and (uniquely in Britain) populated by 30 monks sent from the abbey of Cîteaux in France, the mother house of the Cistercian order. The Medieval Latin name of the monastery was Bellus Locus Regis ("The beautiful place of the king"') or monasterium  Belli loci Regis. Other spellings of the English name which occur historically are Bewley (16th century) and Beaulie (17th century).

History

Foundation
The first Abbot of Beaulieu was Hugh, who stood high in the king's favour, often served in important diplomatic missions and was later to become Bishop of Carlisle. The king granted the new abbey a rich endowment, including numerous manors spread across southern England (particularly in Berkshire), land in the New Forest, corn, large amounts of money, building materials, 120 cows, 12 bulls, a golden chalice, and an annual tun of wine. John's son and successor, King Henry III was equally generous to Beaulieu, with the result that the abbey became very wealthy, though it was far from the richest English Cistercian house.

Monks from Beaulieu founded four daughter houses, Netley Abbey in Hampshire (1239), Hailes Abbey in Gloucestershire (1246), Newenham Abbey in Devon (1247) and St Mary Graces Abbey in London (1350).

Buildings

The abbey's buildings were of a scale and magnificence reflecting its status as an important royal foundation. The church was a vast cruciform structure in early gothic style and heavily influenced by French churches of the order, especially those of Cîteaux, Bonport and Clairvaux. The building took more than four decades to complete and was finally dedicated in 1246, in the presence of King Henry III and his queen, of Richard, Earl of Cornwall, and of many prelates and nobles.

South of the church stood a cloister, ranged around which were the chapter house, refectory, kitchens, storehouse and quarters for the monks, lay brothers and the abbot. A separate infirmary complex lay to the east of the main buildings, connected to them by a passage. The abbey was surrounded by workshops, farm buildings, guesthouses, a mill, and extensive gardens and fishponds. Strongly fortified gatehouses controlled entry to the monastic enclosure, which was defended by a wall. A water gate allowed access to ships in the river.

Exemption and sanctuary
Pope Innocent III constituted Beaulieu an "exempt abbey", meaning that the abbot had to answer to no local bishop but only to the Pope himself. Beaulieu was also invested by the same Pope with special privileges of sanctuary, much stronger than usual and covering not only the abbey itself but all the 23.5 hectare precinct around as included in the original grant made by King John. As Beaulieu was the only abbey in its region with such large and strongly enforced sanctuary rights, it soon became a refuge for fugitives, both ordinary criminals and debtors and also political enemies of the government. Among these latter were Anne Neville, wife of Warwick the Kingmaker, who sought sanctuary after the Battle of Barnet (1471). Twenty-six years later, Perkin Warbeck fled to Beaulieu from the pursuing armies of Henry VII.

Dissolution

In 1535 the abbey's income was assessed in the Valor Ecclesiasticus, Henry VIII's general survey of church finances prior to the expropriation, at £428 gross, £326 net. According to the terms of the first Suppression Act, Henry's initial move in the Dissolution of the Monasteries, this meant that it escaped immediate confiscation, though the clouds were gathering.

The last abbot of Beaulieu was Abbot Thomas Stevens, elected in 1536, who had formerly been abbot of the recently dissolved abbey of Netley, across Southampton Water. Though Beaulieu managed to survive until April 1538, at that point it was finally forced to surrender to the government. Many of the monks were granted pensions, the abbot receiving 100 marks per year. Abbot Thomas ended his days as treasurer of Salisbury Cathedral. He died in 1550.

At the dissolution of the monastery in 1538, the Commissioners for the Dissolution reported to the government that thirty-two sanctuary-men, who were here for debt, felony, or murder, were living in houses in the monastic precincts with their wives and families. When the abbey was dissolved there was some debate about what to do with them, however, in the end it was decided, after pleading by the former abbot and certain government officials, to allow the debtors to live in their houses on the abbey grounds permanently. Pardons were given to some of the criminals too, including one Thomas Jeynes, a murderer.

Country mansion

After Beaulieu fell there was much competition amongst courtiers to gain ownership of the abbey and its valuable estates, but eventually Thomas Wriothesley, 1st Earl of Southampton, won the struggle and King Henry granted him the abbey itself and 3,441 hectares of the Beaulieu lands.

As soon as he took over, Wriothesley set about building himself a house on the site. He demolished the church, as was common practice but, unusually, instead of converting the buildings around the cloister into a home he chose the great gatehouse as the core of his mansion (compare Wriothesley's other converted monastery at Titchfield Abbey or the conversion of neighbouring Netley Abbey). This survives – much extended – as the modern country house at Beaulieu known as Palace House. Lord Southampton preserved the monks' refectory, which he gave to the people of Beaulieu village to be their parish church, a function it still serves today. The west range of the abbey, known as the Domus, was also saved. The rest of the abbey was allowed to fall into ruin.

Today

Although a great deal was destroyed at the time of the Dissolution of the Monasteries, there is still much to see. The groundplan of the 102-metre-long church can be seen on the lawns. The position of the altar is marked by a cross and flanking trees. The Domus, once the lay brothers' refectory and lodgings and, later, chambers for important guests once the lay brothers had vanished, now houses an exhibition of monastic life prior to Thomas Wriothesley's takeover. Visitors can view a series of modern embroidered wall hangings made by Belinda, Lady Montagu, depicting scenes from medieval monastic life and the history of the abbey since 1204. The abbey refectory survives as the parish church and there are substantial ruins of the other buildings round the cloister. The abbey cloister is a place of tranquillity, planted with fragrant herbs. Beaulieu remains in the hands of the descendants of Wriothesley, who still live there.

The Abbey is open to the public as part of the visitor attraction known as "Beaulieu", which includes:

Beaulieu Abbey
National Motor Museum
Beaulieu Palace House
World of Top Gear
Secret Army Exhibition – an exhibit about the Special Operations Executive training at Beaulieu during World War II
Gardens
A monorail
Rides

The Domus is regularly used for events, dining and corporate hospitality.

Folklore

Foundation legend
Beaulieu Abbey was the sole religious foundation of King John. The legend of this event, first told in a Kirkstall chartulary, is related by the antiquarian William Dugdale, who incorrectly suggested that "King John being offended with the Cistercian order in England, and the Abbots of that Order coming to him to reconcile themselves, he caused them to be trod under his Horses Feet, for which Action being terrified in a Dream, he built and bestowed the Abby of Beau-lieu in Newforest for 30 monks of that order." The legend was repeated in a later work by the topographer Thomas Cox. Modern re-tellings of the king's "babbling dream" state that he dreamed of being scourged with rods and thongs by the abbots he had commanded be trampled and he awoke to find his body still ached from the blows in his dream. The king is said to have taken great interest in the construction of the abbey and even to have expressed a desire to be entombed beneath the high altar.

Reported hauntings
Beaulieu, according to the official website, is one of the most haunted places in Britain, with reported sightings going back over a hundred years.

The sound of Gregorian chant, considered an omen by local tradition, have been reported by Mrs Elizabeth Varley, daughter of John Douglas-Scott-Montagu, 2nd Baron Montagu of Beaulieu, and Michael C. Sedgwick, former curator of the National Motor Museum, amongst others.

Among the many reported sightings of monks (allegedly white and brown clad) in the abbey ruins and in the parish church, including one by the actress Margaret Rutherford, is an often repeated tale involving a group of local boys sheltering from a storm in a disused boathouse who see a rowing boat making for the shore.

The eccentric Reverend Robert Frazer Powles, Vicar of Beaulieu (1886–1939), claimed to have gone so far as to converse with ghostly monks whom he knew by name, and even to have celebrated candlelit midnight mass every Christmas Eve for them.

In culture

Beaulieu Abbey is the setting of the opening chapters in Sir Arthur Conan Doyle's historical novel The White Company. F. T. Prince's poem "At Beaulieu"', from his 1963 collection, The Doors of Stone, describes the double heart-coffin on display in the Abbey. Prince, who was Professor of English at the University of Southampton from 1957 to 1974, probably visited the site sometime in the late 1950s/early 1960s. Sir John Betjeman's poem "Youth and Age on Beaulieu River" is based on a visit he made to the New Forest. Beaulieu Abbey plays a prominent role in Edward Rutherfurd's novel The Forest.

Burials at the abbey
Isabel Marshal
Thomas Skevington

See also
Great Coxwell Barn
Titchfield Abbey
Baron Montagu of Beaulieu
List of English abbeys, priories and friaries serving as parish churches

Notes

External links

Beaulieu - official attraction site including the Abbey
In-depth history of the abbey from the Victoria County History
Beaulieu at The Heritage Trail
Beaulieu on the Sheffield University Cistercian abbeys website
Image of Palace House, the Tudor and later mansion built around the former monastic gatehouse. The mediaeval building is on the right
Ruins of the chapter house of the abbey

Religious organizations established in the 1200s
Cistercian monasteries in England
Abbeys in Hampshire
History of Hampshire
Tourist attractions in Hampshire
Christian monasteries established in the 13th century
Museums in Hampshire
Religious museums in England
Hampshire folklore
1203 establishments in England
1538 disestablishments in England
Ruined abbeys and monasteries
Ruins in Hampshire
Reportedly haunted locations in South East England
Monasteries dissolved under the English Reformation
New Forest folklore